The 1934 U.S. Open was the 38th U.S. Open, held June 7–9 at Merion Golf Club in Ardmore, Pennsylvania, a suburb northwest of Philadelphia. Olin Dutra won his only U.S. Open, a stroke ahead of runner-up Gene Sarazen on the East Course. Dutra overcame an eight-stroke deficit after 36 holes to win his second major title; he won the PGA Championship in 1932.

Bobby Cruickshank opened the tournament with a pair of 71s, and had a three-stroke lead over Sarazen at the midway point. Sarazen carded a 73 in the third round to take a one-shot lead over Cruickshank. In the final round on Saturday afternoon, both Cruickshank and Sarazen were overcome by Dutra, who took the lead after birdies at 10 and 15. Sarazen took a triple bogey on the 11th while Cruickshank bogeyed 5 of the final 7 holes. Despite a pair of bogeys to finish the round, Dutra's 72 (+2) and total of 293 (+13) was enough to secure the victory.

Dutra's win was all the more impressive after he fell ill before the tournament and was laid up for three days in his hotel room. He lost  and could not practice for ten days. He was about to withdraw until his brother Mortie, who finished in 28th place, convinced him to play on. His 36-hole comeback from eight shots down was the largest in U.S. Open history until Arnold Palmer equaled it in 1960. From California, Dutra was the first U.S. Open champion born in the western United States.

Former caddies in Texas at the same course in Fort Worth, Ben Hogan and Byron Nelson played in their first major championship, and both missed the cut, shooting 158 and 162, respectively. Lawson Little finished as low amateur in 25th place; he won the title six years later in 1940 as a professional.

Merion Golf Club was affiliated with the Merion Cricket Club until 1941. This was the first U.S. Open at Merion, which hosted its fifth in 2013, all on the East Course.

Course

East Course 

Source:

Past champions in the field 

Source:

 All former champions in the field made the cut

Round summaries

First round
Thursday, June 7, 1934

Source:

Second round
Friday, June 8, 1934

Source:

Third round
Saturday, June 9, 1934 (morning)

Source:

Final round
Saturday, June 9, 1934 (afternoon)

Source:

Scorecard

Cumulative tournament scores, relative to par
{|class="wikitable" span = 50 style="font-size:85%;
|-
|style="background: Pink;" width=10|
|Birdie
|style="background: PaleGreen;" width=10|
|Bogey
|style="background: Green;" width=10|
|Double bogey
|style="background: Olive;" width=10|
|Triple bogey+
|}
Source:

References

External links
USGA Championship Database
USOpen.com - 1934
Trenham Golf History – 1934 U.S. Open
USGA – Looking back: 1934 U.S. Open

U.S. Open (golf)
Golf in Pennsylvania
U.S. Open
U.S. Open
U.S. Open
June 1934 sports events